January King cabbage (Brassica oleracea var. sabauda, 'January King') is a cultivar with intermediate morphology between Savoy cabbage and white cabbage. It is known as chou de Milan de Pontoise in France.

'January King' cabbage is a winter vegetable which has been cultivated in England since 1867. It has blue green leaves blushed with purple or red, and its small heads weigh .

References 

Leaf vegetables
Cabbage
Food plant cultivars